Alexander Arabadjiev (born 1949) is a Bulgarian lawyer and is a judge at the Court of Justice of the European Union.

He graduated with legal studies (St Kliment Ohridski University, Sofia); Judge at the District Court, Blagoevgrad (1975–83); Judge at the Regional Court, Blagoevgrad (1983–86); Judge at the Supreme Court (1986–91); Judge at the Constitutional Court (1991-2000); member of the European Commission of Human Rights (1997–99); member of the European Convention on the Future of Europe (2002–03); member of the National Assembly (2001–06); Observer at the European Parliament; Judge at the Court of Justice since 12 January 2007.

See also

List of members of the European Court of Justice

References

European Court of Justice judges
Bulgarian judges
Sofia University alumni
Living people
1949 births
Members of the European Commission of Human Rights
Bulgarian judges of international courts and tribunals